Commitment to Complications is the second studio album by American electro-industrial duo Youth Code, released on April 8, 2016 through Dais Records. The album was produced by Rhys Fulber of Front Line Assembly.

"Anagnorisis" was released as a 7-inch single in 2015 with the B-side "Shift of Dismay".

Background and composition
Following two tours opening for Skinny Puppy, Youth Code returned to the studio to begin their sophomore album. Rhys Fulber of Front Line Assembly, another band Youth Code opened for, was brought in to produce the album. About the refinement of their music, Ryan George said:

Critical reception

Commitment to Complications was met with generally positive reviews. Writing for AllMusic, Neil Z. Yeung saw the album as a refinement of Youth Code's sound, saying, "Commitment to Complications demonstrates clear growth from the former hardcore kids, establishing Youth Code as a distinctive duo instead of merely a derivative tribute to their influences." Andy O'Connor of Pitchfork wrote that the album "strikes the ideal balance between the visceral nature of the  innovative L.A. hardcore group Youth Code's demo and the polish in their work since then." In his review of Commitment to Complications, Hans Rollman of PopMatters commended Youth Code for reinvigorating industrial and electronic music, saying the band is undoubtedly worth following.

Track listing
All songs written by Sara Taylor and Ryan George.

Personnel
Youth Code
 Sara Taylor – vocals, keyboards, synthesizers, sampling
 Ryan George – keyboards, synthesizers, sampling, backing vocals

Additional personnel
 Rhys Fulber – production, mixing
 Josh Bonati – mixing
 Ben Falgoust – vocals (3)
 Todd Jones – guitars (10)

References

2016 albums
Youth Code albums
Albums produced by Rhys Fulber